
Year 1506 (MDVI) was a common year starting on Thursday (link will display the full calendar) of the Julian calendar.

Events 
 January–June 
 January 14 – The classical statue of Laocoön and His Sons is unearthed in Rome. On the recommendation of Giuliano da Sangallo and Michelangelo, Pope Julius II purchases it, and places it on public display in the Vatican a month later.
 January 22 – The Swiss Guard arrives at the Vatican, to serve as permanent ceremonial and palace guards under Pope Julius II.
 April 18 – Pope Julius II lays the foundation stone of the new (current) St. Peter's Basilica in Rome, replacing the Old St. Peter's Basilica.
 April 19–21 – Lisbon Massacre: Thousands of Jews are tortured and killed by Catholics in Lisbon, Portugal.
 April 30 – Malus Intercursus, a treaty between King Henry VII of England and Duke Philip IV of Burgundy, is signed.

 July–December 
 August 6 – Battle of Kletsk: The Grand Duchy of Lithuania defeats the Tatars of the Crimean Khanate.
 August 19 – Sigismund I the Old succeeds his brother as king of Poland.
 September 2 – Yeonsangun of the Joseon Dynasty is deposed in the Jungjong coup, and King Jungjong ascends to the throne.
 November 6 – Pope Julius II personally leads his troops into Bologna, retaking the city from the excommunicated tyrant Giovanni II Bentivoglio.

 Date unknown 
 The Portuguese mariner Tristão da Cunha sights the islands of Tristan da Cunha, naming them after himself.
 In Ming dynasty China, the costs of the courier system are met by a tax in silver on land, instead of corvée labor service.
 Duarte Barbosa returns to Lisbon.
 Johannes Trithemius becomes abbot of the monastery of St. Jacob, at Würzburg.
 Leonardo da Vinci completes most of his work on the Mona Lisa.

Births 

 February – George Buchanan, Scottish humanist scholar (d. 1582)
 February 2 – René de Birague, French cardinal and chancellor (d. 1583)
 February 15 – Juliana of Stolberg, German countess (d. 1580)
 March 3 – Luís of Portugal, Duke of Beja (d. 1555)
 April 7 – Francis Xavier, Spanish Jesuit saint (d. 1552)
 April 13 – Peter Faber, French Jesuit theologian (d. 1546)
 July 1 – Louis II of Hungary and Bohemia (d. 1526)
 August 12 – Franciscus Sonnius, Dutch counter-Reformation theologian (d. 1576)
 October – Louis de Blois, Flemish mystical writer (d. 1566)
 December 4 – Thomas Darcy, 1st Baron Darcy of Chiche, English courtier (d. 1558)
 December 8 – Veit Dietrich, German theologian, writer and reformer (d. 1549)
 date unknown
 Vicente Masip, Spanish painter (d. 1579)
 William Paget, 1st Baron Paget, English statesman (d. 1563)
 Ii Naomori, Japanese samurai (d. 1560)
 probable
 Elizabeth Barton, English nun (d. 1534)
 Margaret Lee, confidante of Queen Anne Boleyn (d. 1543)

Deaths 

 January 21 – Johann IV Roth, German Roman Catholic bishop (b. 1426)
 May 4 – Sultan Husayn Mirza Bayqara, Timurid ruler of Herat (b. 1438)
 May 20 – Christopher Columbus, Italian explorer (b. c.1451)
 August 15 – Alexander Agricola, Flemish composer (b. c. 1445) 
 August 19 – King Alexander Jagiellon of Poland (b. 1461)
 September 13 – Andrea Mantegna, Italian painter and engraver (b. 1432)
 September 25 – King Philip I of Castile (b. 1478)
 September 30 – Beatrice, Duchess of Viseu, Portuguese infante (b. 1430)
 November 8 – Edward Hastings, 2nd Baron Hastings, English noble (b. 1466)
 November 20 – Yeonsangun of Joseon, king of Korean Joseon Dynasty (b. 1476)
 November 21 – Engelbert, Count of Nevers, younger son of John I (b. 1462)
 date unknown – Mihri Hatun, Ottoman poet

References